Bakhteyar Gulam Mangal (born 1928) was an Afghan field hockey player, who competed at the 1948 Summer Olympic Games and the 1956 Summer Olympic Games. He played in six matches in all, scoring 3 goals.

References

External links
 

Field hockey players at the 1948 Summer Olympics
Field hockey players at the 1956 Summer Olympics
Olympic field hockey players of Afghanistan
Afghan male field hockey players
Possibly living people
1928 births